Jürgen Richter (born 5 August 1970) is an Austrian diver. He competed in the men's 3 metre springboard event at the 1992 Summer Olympics.

References

External links
 

1970 births
Living people
Austrian male divers
Olympic divers of Austria
Divers at the 1992 Summer Olympics
Divers from Vienna